Sorcerer Solitaire is a 1979 role-playing game adventure for Tunnels & Trolls published by Flying Buffalo.

Plot summary
Sorcerer Solitaire is a solo adventure in which the player character is a magic-user investing a haunted house in the night.

Reception
Lorin Rivers reviewed Sorcerer Solitaire in The Space Gamer No. 28. Rivers commented that "With its good points and bad, this remains a unique and fairly pleasant adventure."

References

Role-playing game supplements introduced in 1979
Tunnels & Trolls adventures